The 10th CARIFTA Games was held in Nassau, Bahamas on April 20–21, 1981.  An appraisal of the results has been given on the occasion of 40th anniversary of the games.

Participation (unofficial)

Detailed result lists can be found on the "World Junior Athletics History" website. An unofficial count yields the number of about 196 athletes (128 junior (under-20) and 68 youth (under-17)) from about 16 countries: Antigua and Barbuda (7), Bahamas (47), Barbados (22), Bermuda (18), British Virgin Islands (1), Cayman Islands (3), Grenada (5), Guadeloupe (11), Guyana (1), Jamaica (50), Lesser Antilles (1), Martinique (6), Saint Kitts and Nevis (2), Saint Vincent and the Grenadines (4), Trinidad and Tobago (14), US  Virgin Islands (4).

Medal summary
Medal winners are published by category: Boys under 20 (Junior), Girls under 20 (Junior), Boys under 17 (Youth), and Girls under 17 (Youth).
Complete results can be found on the "World Junior Athletics History"
website.

Boys under 20 (Junior)

Girls under 20 (Junior)

Boys under 17 (Youth)

Girls under 17 (Youth)

Medal table (unofficial)

References

External links
World Junior Athletics History

CARIFTA Games
International athletics competitions hosted by the Bahamas
CARIFTA Games
CARIFTA Games
CARIFTA Games